Willem Jozef Andreas Jonckbloet  (6 July 1817, The Hague – 19 October 1885, Wiesbaden) was a Dutch historian, best known for work on medieval poetry.

From 1835 he was a student at the University of Leiden. After pursuing medicine and law, he turned to Low German literature. From 1847 at Deventer, he became a professor at Leiden in 1878.

In 1855 he became member of the Royal Netherlands Academy of Arts and Sciences.

Works
 Geschiedenis der middennederlandsche dichtkunst (Amsterdam 1851-55, 3 Bde.) 
 Étude sur le roman de Renart (Groningen 1863)  
 Geschiedenis der Nederlandsche letterkunde (Groningen 1868-70; Bde.)

References

External links
 Biography in the Digitale Bibliotheek voor de Nederlandse Letteren

1817 births
1885 deaths
Academic staff of Leiden University
Writers from The Hague
Members of the Royal Netherlands Academy of Arts and Sciences